Wanstead was a two-decker sailing ship built of fir in 1811 in America at Newbury Point, almost surely under another name. She was taken in prize circa 1813. As Wanstead she made one voyage transporting convicts to Australia. She then returned to merchant trade but was wrecked off Brazil in 1816.

Career
Wanstead first appeared in Lloyd's Register (LR) in 1813. Her hull was sheathed in copper in 1813.

Under the command of Henry Moore she sailed from Spithead, England on 24 August 1813, and arrived at Port Jackson on 9 January 1814. Wanstead was to transport 120 female convicts, but one was landed before the ship left Britain. Two of the convicts died on the voyage. One of the women on board was Elizabeth Chidlow, a co-conspirator of the forger William Booth.

Wanstead left Port Jackson on 10 February 1814 bound for Batavia.

Lloyd's Register for 1815 still showed her trade as London-Botany Bay, but indicated that she had received a new master, J. Strickland, later in the year.

Loss
Lloyd's List reported in December 1816 that Wanstead, Strickland, master, sailing from Maranham to Liverpool, had been wrecked off Maranham.

Citations and references
Citations

References
 
 

1811 ships
Ships built in Maine
Convict ships to New South Wales
Maritime incidents in 1816
Age of Sail merchant ships
Merchant ships of the United Kingdom